The  Arizona Rattlers season marked the 2nd season for the franchise. The Rattlers sold out every home during the season.

Regular season

Schedule

Standings

z – clinched homefield advantage

y – clinched division title

x – clinched playoff spot

Playoffs

Roster

Awards

External links
1993 Arizona Rattlers on ArenaFan.com

Arizona Rattlers seasons
1993 Arena Football League season
20th century in Phoenix, Arizona
1993 in sports in Arizona